Irwin Field is a ballpark in Tyler, TX and home to the UT Tyler Patriots baseball team of the American Southwest Conference. The venue holds a capacity of 1,000.

The ballpark was named after local philanthropists Robert B. and Mary Irwin.

See also
 Fair Park (Tyler, Texas)
 Mike Carter Field

References

Baseball venues in East Texas
UT Tyler Patriots
Buildings and structures in Tyler, Texas